Cocktail is a 2006 Hong Kong film produced and directed by Herman Yau and Long Ching. The film stars Candy Lo, Endy Chow, and Race Wong.

Plot
Candy, a pensive character, owns the fashionable Hong Kong bar Half Mortal. After she gives a bartender job to Paul, her part-time employee Stella, a psychology student, teaches him. Paul is skilled in being able to mix drinks that are suitable for what his customers are feeling. Paul is from a complicated background. He grieves as just a while ago, his alcoholic father had died. Paul has stopped going to school. A novice with dating women, he has fallen in love with Stella but is incoherent when talking to her. He ponders whether drinking will bring him happiness or in Stella's view just transforms how they will behave.

Cast
 Candy Lo as Candy
 Endy Chow as Paul
 Race Wong as Stella
 Bobo Chan as Macy
 Lawrence Cheng as Yip Chi-feng
 Chiu Suet-Fei as Yuki (credited as Suet-fei)
 Eric Kot as Tong
 Amanda Lee
 Johnson Lee as John
 Anson Leung as Yat (credited as Chun-yat Leung)
 Peng Wai-On (credited as Eddie Peng)
 Ellis Tang as Hong (credited as Siu-yan Tang)
 Patrick Tang
 Kwok Cheung Tsang as Kuen
 Monie Tung as Fei
 Otto Wang as guest

Analysis
According to a Hong Kong Film Critics Society review, the film's message whether made deliberately or not is "the drunken world is good, but the sober real world is not necessarily bad". The South China Morning Post called the film "a mild melodrama about the romances of urban twentysomethings" and a "dramatic comed[y] aimed at teens".

Reception
In a Hong Kong Film Critics Society review, the film critic wrote, "As for Cocktail, although the content is relatively cliché and some scenes are a bit sensational, regarding the part of it dealing with the relationship between father and son, I personally think it is better than After This Our Exile."

References

External links
 
 
Cocktail at Hong Kong Cinemagic

2006 films
Hong Kong romantic drama films
2000s Cantonese-language films
2000s romance films
Films directed by Herman Yau